Static Line or static line can mean:

 Static line, a fixed cord attached used for low jumps and training in parachuting
 A rope that does not stretch when under load: see dynamic rope
 Static Line (G.I. Joe), a fictional character in the G.I. Joe universe
 Static Line (magazine), a monthly email-based periodical which ran from July 1998 to March 2004